Ely Moore (July 4, 1798 – January 27, 1860) was an American newspaperman and labor leader who served two terms as a Jacksonian U.S. Representative from New York from 1835 to 1839.

Moore was the first labor leader of a national scope in America.

Biography 
Moore was born near Belvidere, New Jersey. He attended public schools, and then moved to New York and studied medicine. He became a printer and an editor of a New York City labor paper.

Union leader 
Moore headed and established the General Trades Union of New York. The GTU was the first Union containing multiple trades. He then was elected the first president of 
New York City’s Federation of Craft Unions in 1833. In 1834 Ely Moore became the first President of the National Trade Union. The NTU spanned from Boston to St. Louis. The NTU helped to establish the 10 hour work day in many states. New York had already established the 10 hour work day.

In 1836, Moore performed one of his last speeches. It was a stunning defense of Workers, Unions, and the Free Labor System. His stunning oration was in reply to an insulting speech by Waddy Thompson, Jr. of South Carolina that called northern laborers "thieves who would raise wages through insurrection or by the equally terrible process of the ballot-box." Moore's speech contained stirring aggravation at the unjust moneyed aristocracy, Nicholas Biddle (second US Bank), and the lack of equality of the wage earning worker. During his most heated rhetoric he collapsed onto the podium.

Political career 
His first interest in national politics was to endorse Richard Mentor Johnson, on March 13, 1833, for Vice President, because he opposed the Sabbatarian Movement (contrary to the freedom of religion), and supported replacing imprisonment for debt with a bankruptcy law.

He was a Tammany Hall candidate for Congress in 1834 and 1836; in the latter year, he was also supported by the Locofocos, like Churchill C. Cambreleng, the other Tammany candidate to be successful. He was defeated in 1838: his district, which returned four Congressmen, went largely Whig, but President Martin Van Buren appointed him Collector of the Port of New York, and he supported Van Buren for re-election in 1840, although he lost to William Henry Harrison. Moore was one of the radical leaders to support the Dorr Rebellion in Rhode Island in 1842.

He was one of the radicals who criticized the early abolitionists in the interest of labor, seeing a Whig plot to introduce the Negro as cheap competition in the labor market, and keep wages low.

Moore was appointed by President James K. Polk United States marshal for the southern district of New York in 1845. He became owner and editor of the Warren Journal of his hometown, Belvidere, New Jersey. He was appointed agent for the Miami and other tribes of Indians in Kansas in 1853. He was appointed register of the United States land office in Lecompton, Kansas, in 1855 and served until 1860.

Death 
He died in Lecompton, Douglas County, Kansas, on January 27, 1860, at the age of 61 and is interred on his farm near Lecompton.

References

Sean Wilentz. The Rise of American Democracy. W.W. Norton. New York and London. 2005.
Arthur M. Schlesinger, Jr., The Age of Jackson, Little Brown, 1945.
Joshua R. Greenberg. Advocating the Man: Masculinity, Organized Labor, and the Household in New York, 1800–1840, Columbia University Press. New York. 2009.

External links
Ely Moore entry at The Political Graveyard

1798 births
1860 deaths
People from Lecompton, Kansas
People from Warren County, New Jersey
United States Marshals
Jacksonian members of the United States House of Representatives from New York (state)
19th-century American politicians
Democratic Party members of the United States House of Representatives from New York (state)
American trade union leaders